Charles Avery Mason (August 2, 1904 - March 6, 1970) was bishop of the Episcopal Diocese of Dallas, serving from 1946 to 1970.

Early life
Mason was born in St. Louis, Missouri on August 2, 1904, the son of Charles Henry Mason and Mary C. Avery. He was educated at the Yeatman High School in St. Louis. He graduated with a Bachelor of Arts in 1926 from the Washington and Lee University, and a Bachelor of Divinity from the Virginia Theological Seminary in 1929. He was awarded a Doctor of Sacred Theology from Temple University in 1940.

Ordination
Mason was ordained deacon on June 17, 1928 by Bishop Frederick Foote Johnson of Missouri, and priest on May 26, 1929. He served as assistant at St Stephen's Church in Washington, D.C. and then in 1929 became curate at St Agnes' Chapel of Trinity Church in New York City. In 1930 he became rector of Ascension Church in West New Brighton, Staten Island, New York City. In 1942 he was appointed office secretary of the Forward in Service program and later became its director, a post he retained until his election to the episcopacy.

Bishop
Mason was elected Coadjutor Bishop of Dallas and was consecrated on September 21, 1945 in St Matthew's Cathedral by Presiding Bishop Henry St. George Tucker. He succeeded as diocesan bishop on October 4, 1946 and remained in office until his death on March 6, 1970.

References 

An Episcopal Dictionary of the Church

1904 births
1970 deaths
20th-century American Episcopalians
Episcopal bishops of Dallas
20th-century American clergy